The Walloon Guard was a collaborationist paramilitary formation which served as an auxiliary police in German-occupied Belgium and parts of Northern France during World War II. It was established in November 1941 with the support of the Rexist Party and was officially incorporated into the German Army (Wehrmacht) alongside the Feldgendarmerie. In contrast to the Walloon Legion, established in June 1941, which participated in fighting on the Eastern Front the Walloon Guard was used within Belgium and initially found it easier to attract volunteers because of the comparatively high salaries offered. The first battalion was raised on 17 November 1941. It was used primarily for guarding railways and military installations but also participated in the repression of the resistance and deserters from labour deportation. Historian Flore Plisnier notes that "violence became endemic within the formation, ruining its reputation vis-a-vis other pro-German organisations". Particularly notable was the so-called Bande Jayé, named after its leader, Marcel Jayé, which became indistinguishable from German units and terrorised the civilian population in parts of the Borinage.

See also
Flemish Guard, founded in May 1941 but initially beyond direct German control.

References

Bibliography

Military units and formations established in 1941
Belgian collaboration during World War II
1941 establishments in Belgium
Foreign volunteer units of the Wehrmacht
Auxiliary police units of Nazi Germany